Kexby may refer to:

 Kexby, Lincolnshire, England
 Kexby, North Yorkshire, England

Kexby may be a person:

 William Kexby, English 14th-century college master and archdeacon